Gerald Taylor is the name of:

 Gerald Kyffin-Taylor (1863–1949), British soldier and politician
 Gerry Taylor (born 1947), English footballer
 Gerald Taylor (actor) (1940–1994), actor and Dalek operator in Doctor Who; see The Daleks
 Gerald L. Taylor aka Jerry Taylor (fl. 1970s), publisher of National Lampoon magazine
 Gerry Taylor (golfer) (fl. 1985–1988), Australian professional golfer; see U-Bix Classic
 Gérald Taylor (fl. 1995), Australian-French linguist; see 
 Gerald Taylor (footballer), Costa Rican footballer with Deportivo Saprissa

See also
Jerry Taylor (disambiguation)